Nilwood Township (T11N R6W) is located in Macoupin County, Illinois, United States. As of the 2010 census, its population was 637 and it contained 293 housing units.

Geography

Demographics

Adjacent townships
 Girard Township (north)
 Bois D'Arc Township, Montgomery County (northeast)
 Pitman Township, Montgomery County (east)
 Zanesville Township, Montgomery County (southeast)
 Shaws Point Township (south)
 Carlinville Township (southwest)
 South Otter Township (west)
 North Otter Township (northwest)

References

External links
US Census
City-data.com
Illinois State Archives

Townships in Macoupin County, Illinois
Townships in Illinois